The Ocean-V RNA motif is a conserved RNA structure discovered using bioinformatics.  Only a few Ocean-V RNA sequences have been detected, all in sequences derived from DNA that was extracted from uncultivated bacteria found in ocean water.  As of 2010, no Ocean-V RNA has been detected in any known, cultivated organism.

References

External links
 

Non-coding RNA